Antioch is an unincorporated community in Jackson Parish, Louisiana, United States.

Notes

Unincorporated communities in Jackson Parish, Louisiana
Unincorporated communities in Louisiana